Pucklechurch is a large village and civil parish in South Gloucestershire, England. It has a current population of about 3000. The village dates back over a thousand years and was once the site of a royal hunting lodge, as it adjoined a large forest.

A Royal Air Force station called RAF Pucklechurch existed until 1959, when the site was transferred to HM Prison Service.

Geography
Bordering at its western boundary the Bristol Semi-Ring Road, the village forms a large eastern cluster of development on a raised area of land in the parish, the northern half of which has 14 listed buildings including the church. It is located  ENE of the city of Bristol and  NW of the city of Bath.

Through the far north of the parish which is farmland  from the village centre the busy M4 motorway passes.

History

The land of Pucklechurch is relatively prominent in elevation compared to surrounding areas and as such it was selected in the Bronze Age as the site of a tumulus (round barrow) at Shortwood Hill.

Saxon royal villa or palace
Pucklechurch royal villa or palace was one of only a few in the Kingdom of Wessex and was adjoined on the west by a very large hunting forest, Kingswood, which was larger than today's settlement of the same name. The palace became prominent in the two centuries before the Norman Conquest, therefore during the early part of the Kingdom of England, before becoming wrecked. Much of its stone was later removed.

The Anglo-Saxon Chronicle states that King Edmund I was murdered here, at his hunting lodge, in 946: "A.D. 946. This year King Edmund died, on St. Augustine's mass day. That was widely known, how he ended his days: that Leof or Liofa stabbed him at Pucklechurch."

The above reference is the first attestation of the name of Pucklechurch, in which it is spelt Puclancyrce. The name appears as Pulcrecerce in the Domesday Book of 1086. The name means 'Pucela's church'.

Behind Pucklechurch's Star Inn is the site of this ancient royal villa. In 950 King Eadred gave 25 hides of land (at Pucelancyrcan) to the Abbey of Glastonbury.

Domesday Book
The Domesday Book records these hides as belonging to St. Mary's church, which was in Glastonbury Abbey's grounds. It notes:
"[The church of] St Mary of Glastonbury holds Pucklechurch. There are twenty hides. In demesne are six ploughs and twenty three villans and eight bordars with eighteen ploughs. There are ten slaves and six men render 100 ingots of iron less ten and in Gloucester one burgess pays 5d and two coliberts pay 34d and there are 3 Frenchmen and two mills rendering 100d. There are sixty acres of meadow and woodland half a league long and a half broad. It was worth £20, now £30 [to its overlord per year]".

Held by the Bishop of Bath & Wells and construction of the existing church
The large and fertile manor of Pucklechurch was held by the Bishop of Bath & Wells from 1275, who received it from Glastonbury Abbey, as a document in the Calendar of Bishops of Bath & Wells, dated April 1275 records: 
"Accord between Robert Bishop of Bath and Wells and John Abbot of Glastonbury, namely that whereas Robert late Abbot of Glastonbury and the convent quitclaimed to Walter late Bishop of Bath & Wells the manor and advowson [right to appoint the priest] of Pokeleschyrch [sic]..." 

The church building largely dates to the 13th and 14th centuries, from the time when it was under the Bishop's patronage. Its listing emphasises how visible the original stonework fabric is and says "it is substantially a medieval building"; its Victorian amendments were "carried out by R C Carpenter, and later by J D Sedding...of good quality, reflecting the involvement of these experienced ecclesiastical architects". This assessment is under the official listing of English Heritage, which took place in 1985 and, as the organisation has re-assessed it, in 2010.

Farmed to Denys family

To save his see from the administrative burden of collecting all the rents within the manor, the Bishop farmed the manor to Sir Gilbert Denys (d.1422), of nearby Siston, that is to say, gave him the right to keep all the rents he could collect in exchange for an annual one-off payment of £40. One must assume that Denys would have been willing to pay more than anyone else for the privilege, as he already held the next-door manor of Siston, making for convenient administration. In the Communar's Accounts of the See of Bath and Wells the following entries are recorded:1400–01 Received from Gilbert Denys, knt, for farm of Pokelchurch £40
1400–01 Paid to servant of Sir Gilbert Denys for venison from Pokelchurch for the canons 2s
1407/8 Received from Sir Gilbert Denys, farmer of the church at Pucklechurch £40
1407/9 Expenses of the steward about the agreement with Sir Gilbert Denys and on other occasions £1 3s 2d.
1407/9 Received from Gilbert Denys for wood at Crotesmor £5 13s 4d
1408/9 Received from Sir Gilbert Denys for the farm of Pucklechurch, £5 being remitted for the first term £35
1414–18 Expenses of holding a court at Pucklechurch and treating with Gilbert Denys at Sixton (Siston) and Olvyston (Olveston) and with Abbatiston (Abson?) parish £1 1s 5½d
1414–18 Expenses: Sir Gilbert Denys £2 and his bailiff 3s 4d and his entertainment for horses and men at Simon Bayly's (11s 8d) £2 15s
1414–18 Expenses hire of 2 horses at Wells and holding a court at Pucklechurch 1s 11d
1414–18 Rec'd from the bailiff of Pucklechurch, rent and perquisites of court £1 7s 5d
1417–18 Received from Sir Gilbert Denys for the farm of Pucklechurch £40
1417–18 Expenses at Pucklechurch, with horse hire, about tithes in Pucklechurch, Abbatiston (Abson?) and Westleigh (Westerleigh?) and arranging with Gilbert Denys £1 8s 1d

It would seem that it was a pleasant day out for a couple of the canons or friars of Wells to hire horses and ride over to talk business with Denys, perhaps an excuse to enjoy some all-expenses paid entertainment. It appears that Denys held the farm until his death in 1422, although records are not available to confirm this. At the Dissolution of the Monasteries the manor was granted to William Herbert, 1st Earl of Pembroke from whom it was acquired by Sir Maurice Denys (d.1561), Treasurer of Calais and builder of Siston Court. From him the manor passed to his cousin Hugh Denys, and a cadet (younger) branch of the Denys family became lords of the manor of Pucklechurch until the death of William Dennis in 1701, last of the male line. The Heralds' Visitation of Gloucestershire in 1623 records John Denys (d.1559) as "of Pucklechurch", High Sheriff of Gloucestershire in 1551. He was the youngest son of Sir Walter Denys (d.1505) of Alveston, buried in Olveston Church, and the youngest brother of Sir William Denys (d.1535) of the adjacent manor of Dyrham. In St. Thomas a Becket Church is a memorial to Henry Dennis (d.1638), Squire of Pucklechurch, son of John "Dennys", fisherman and poet who wrote the earliest English poetical treatise on fishing "The Secrets of Angling" published in 1613.

Coal mining
Parkfield Colliery operated near Pucklechurch from 1851 to 1936. Bristol Archives hold several documents detailing the leases and sale of the coal mining rights by Mary and Elizabeth Dennis, the co-heiresses of William Dennis (d.1701). A deed dated 2 February 1719 reads:
"Articles of Agreement – 1) Mary Dennis of Westminster, Middx. singlewoman 2) John Whitewood of Mangotsfield, Glos., coalminer and Daniell Alsopp of Pucklechurch, Glos. yeo. – granting licence to dig for coals upon farm in or near Shortwood in Pucklechurch rented from her by Daniell Alsopp and to carry away and sell the same. Term 120 years. Whitewood and Alsopp to pay her 3s. for every 20s. worth of coal. Covenants re.making good of damage, appointment of clerk to keep accounts, etc."

World War II and RAF Pucklechurch
During World War II the No.11 Balloon Centre, a barrage balloon depot, was built here. This protected against the Blitz which, as anticipated by the British, included Nazi Germany targeting with bomber aeroplanes the docks of Bristol from various approaches near the village. After the war this became a non-flying Royal Air Force station called RAF Pucklechurch until 1959. In 1962 the site was transferred to HM Prison Service.

Prison
From 1962 the Pucklechurch Remand Centre was built on the RAF Pucklechurch site, opened in 1965 and expanded in 1978. The remand centre was destroyed in a riot in 1990. This made headline national news and was discussed in the House of Lords.

The site on the edge of the developed area became Ashfield Young Offender Institution, which opened in 1999. In 2013 it was closed for young offenders following a critical inspection report that concluded offenders were "exposed to unacceptable levels of violence" and in June 2013 the Ministry for Justice announced it will become a closed adult prison dealing with sex offenders.

Governance
The village falls in 'Boyd Valley' electoral ward. This ward starts in the north east at Pucklechurch and stretches south westerly to Marshfield. The total population of this ward taken at the 2011 census was 7,446.

The village elders regularly gather in the village hall on Abson Road. There, the parish council decides upon matters of local importance to the Pucklechurch community.

Amenities 

The village contains a church, shops including a small bakery, a small hairdresser, a local convenience store and a newsagent.

Recreation Ground
A main public open space, this was formerly a central fortified, enclosed area adjoining the former palace area called "The Burrell" on the tithe map of 1843, which may mean "a defended site set on a hill". Evidence suggests that Pucklechurch was a place of great importance, even before the tenth century. This was a primitive safe place for the Saxons and thus generically a "borough/burgh/burh", with a minster church closely associated with either with it and its neighbouring royal lodge that by the Norman Conquest had become important enough to be a possession of wealthy Glastonbury Abbey in a neighbouring county but who had a few choice possessions in Gloucestershire. The Burrell must have retained its royal functions as a meeting place for the hundred before the Norman Conquest and has been an open area seemingly at all times since. The ground is directly between the village hall, the church and The Star inn. Many events are hosted on it throughout the year, including the "Pucklechurch Revel", a parade and fete. Attendance of this event has declined considerably compared to 1951 when it began, but in recent years it has started picking up again thanks to the new facilities which include a high specification car park and an outdoors TV.

Education
Pucklechurch CE VC Primary School provides primary education. At the May 2017 Ofsted inspection the school was judged to be Good in every category and the report states that 'This is a good school'. An early Victorian school was sold to become a private dwelling house.

Public House
In December 2020, there was a [big drugs bust https://www.itv.com/news/westcountry/2020-12-07/seven-men-arrested-following-drugs-bust-at-disused-pucklechurch-pub] at the Fleur de Lis pub.

Landmarks
Two of the central buildings, Moat House  and The Grey House, are Grade II* listed. 15 monuments by the church are also listed.

Transport 
First West of England operates the Y5 bus service from Bristol Bus Station - Yate & Chipping Sodbury via Fishponds, Staple Hill, Mangotsfield, Pucklechurch, and Westerleigh. The route is operated mostly by double deckers on a one hourly basis in each direction from Monday to Saturday with the first bus through the village being at around 06:50 and the last being at around 22:15.

There is also a two hourly service in each direction on Sundays and public holidays. The Y5 replaced the X49 which replaced the old 689 service operated by Wessex in April 2014. Pucklechurch is on the Bristol's outer bus zone.

Stagecoach West operates the 620 Bath-Old Sodbury via Wick, Pucklechurch, Yate, Chipping Sodbury Bus. The service has eight buses a day to Bath and six to Old Sodbury Monday-Friday and six buses a day to Bath and four to Old Sodbury on a Saturday. The service does not operate on Sundays or public holidays. This service was also run by Wessex but Stagecoach West took the 620 over in September 2016.

There are also various school bus services in the village that serve Mangotsfield, SBL, John Cabot, BTE Academy, and St Brendan's Sixth Form College.

The M4 motorway runs through the far north of the village. However, the closest junction onto the motorway is junction 18 or 19 which are approximately four miles from the village. In 2017 plans were released to build a new junction just outside the village on the M4. (Junction 18A) with a link road running through the village linking the junction with the nearby A4174 Bristol Ring Road.

Demography 
At the United Kingdom Census 2011, the population of the parish was 2,904 who lived in 1,153 households. 1,477 residents were in employment, the largest category of work being: Wholesale and Retail Trade; Repair of Motor Vehicles and Motor Cycles, of these, employing 224. The next largest category employed 194 people: Human Health and Social Work Activities.

Twinning association 

Pucklechurch is twinned with Pringy, Seine-et-Marne in France. Local community groups often organise trips and short stays with a similar community group from Pringy.

Localities
Two very small hamlets are linear settlements in the west of the village, separated by green buffers.

Shortwood
Shortwood lies west of the village.

Parkfield
The winding route north-west of the village has a line of houses at the top of Coxgrove Hill and along the road of the same name which leads, including on a short stretch of north-south Roman road, towards Henfield, Gloucestershire and Coalpit Heath beyond.

Politics
Pucklechurch in 2001 formed a ward which chiefly in population and land area contained Dyrham to the east, which elected a councillor to South Gloucestershire Council, a unitary authority providing local government services, by 2011 this had been replaced by Boyd Valley which is slightly larger, covering at that date 7,446 residents, and accordingly electing two councillors of the 70.

Pucklechurch is part of the Thornbury and Yate UK parliament constituency, which elected Conservative Luke Hall in the 2019 general election.

Location grid

References

External links

 The Pucklechurch community website
 Audio from a history walk around Pucklechurch by Gayle Boyle

Villages in South Gloucestershire District
Civil parishes in Gloucestershire